Sufia Begum is a Bangladesh Nationalist Party politician and a Member of Parliament from a reserved seat.

Career
Begum was elected to parliament from reserved seat as an Bangladesh Nationalist Party candidate in February 1996.

References

Bangladesh Nationalist Party politicians
Date of birth missing (living people)
Women members of the Jatiya Sangsad
6th Jatiya Sangsad members
20th-century Bangladeshi women politicians